East Donyland is a civil parish in the Colchester district of Essex, England. The civil parish includes the village of Rowhedge. The parish touches Fingringhoe and Wivenhoe.

History 
The name "Donyland" means 'Land connected with Dunna'. East Donyland was recorded in the Domesday Book (1086) as 'Dunilanda'/'Dunulunda'. On 24 March 1891 part of Fingringhoe parish was transferred to East Donyland, on 1 October 1934 part of East Donyland was transferred to Colchester, on 1 April 1946 part of Langenhoe was transferred to East Donyland, on 1 April 2004 part of East Donyland was transferred to Colchester unparished area.

References

External links

 
 GENUKI

Civil parishes in Essex
Borough of Colchester